Fútbol Club Santiago de Cuba is a Cuban football club, based in the city of Santiago de Cuba, which currently plays in the Campeonato Nacional de Fútbol. Its home stadium is the 5,000-capacity Pista de Atletismo de Rekortan. It was promoted to  Campeonato Nacional for the 2015 season.

Honours
Campeonato Nacional

Winner: 2017, 2018, 2019
Runner-up: 1993, 1994

Current squad

References

Sa
Santiago de Cuba